Cytaea taveuniensis is a jumping spider species in the genus Cytaea. The male was first identified in 2010 by Barbara Maria Patoleta and Joanna Gardzińska. The female has not been described.

Etymology
The species name is derived from the Fijian island Taveuni.

Description
It is similar to Cytaea nausori but is differentiated by its risen embolic base.

Distribution
Xenocytaea vonavonensis is found in Fiji.

References

Spiders of Fiji
taveuniensis
Spiders described in 2010